The Sagar veena is a plucked string instrument used in Punjab and developed in 1970 by prominent Pakistani lawyer Raza Kazim. It has evolved from Vichitra veena in both structure and sound. Similar to the Carnatic Gottuvadhyam (Chitra Vina) and Vichitra veena, it has no frets and is played with a slide. 

Up until today, Kazim's daughter Noor Zehra is the only player of the Sagar since its inception. More than seventeen Sagar Veenas have been made since its inception, with each later version different in variation and advancement. The sagar veena is being developed, studied, and researched at the Sanjan Nagar Institute of Philosophy and Arts in Lahore.

References

External links

 Sagar Veena at Sanjan Nagar Institute 
 Sagar Veena at YouTube

Veena players
String instruments